The New York City Breakers are an original B-boy group in early 1980s that was established in the Bronx borough of New York City. The group originally consisted of members from Wildstyle and "Floor Master Crew"

History
The New York City Breakers are a breaking crew from the Kingsbridge section of the Bronx originally known as the Floor Masters Michael Holman an up-and-coming filmmaker who promoted Hip-Hop parties at a night club called Negril. He Grew bored of watching the same breaking crew dance and wanted to host a Breaking Battle. The Floor Master Crew accepted an invitation in 1982 offering to battle rival crew at club Negril. They combined footwork,style and power. FMC went on in 1982 to battle more rivals crews on That's Incredible Michael Holman saw the crews potential athleticism and soon after signed on to be their manager with the help of the legendary B-boy Lil Lep from the 7 Deadly Sins Crew same block where the famous Tracy 168 Wildstyle crew lived a big influence on Uptown B-boys, and with the help of writer PHASE 2 renamed the crew New York City Breakers. Holman then took some of the Breakers from Floor Master Crew Action, Kid Nice, Glide Master.Holman worked with Chino Lopez founder of The Floor Masters a visionary himself to find and recruit new members to build The New York City Breakers. Chino told Holman about a one in a million B-boy who would really make the crew a force to contend with. This mystery dancer turned out to be Tony Lopez aka Powerful Pexster who was everything Chino promised as a dancer and more, with Powerful Pexster's power moves extraordinaire some credit Pex with being one of the greatest Old School B-boys who ever rocked a floor. Chino's aka Action the master of neck moves, Noel Manguel's aka Kid Nice unique head glides, Mathew Caban aka Glide Master unbelievable fist glides, Lil Lep the wise one a head spin and swipe master the original five NYC Breakers were born. Soon after Lil Lep introduced his friend Bobby Potts aka Flip Rock whose flips and footwork instantly put him into the crew then after adding Tony Draughon aka Tony Mr.Wave Wesley, the NYC Breakers became one of the most famous and influential B-boy and Hip Hop crews in the world.

The first performance the original five NYCBs was on the nationally televised show called The Merv Griffin Show.Soon after, the NYCBs began appearing on everything from music videos Gladys Knight Flash and the Furious Five to Madonna(entertainer) live shows all around the world Soul Train, Ripley's Believe It or Not!, P.M. Magazine, CBS Evening News, Good Morning America, Amnesty International Gala, That's Incredible!, and NBC's Salute to the Olympics just to name a few.

The NYCBs appeared on the first ever Hip Hop TV show called Graffiti Rock they were featured in the book entitle "Breaking and The New York City Breakers" published in the fall of 1984 by Freundlich Books, and released an Album Break-Master Featuring New York City Breakers that went gold with Posters and array of how to break steps and how to judge a breaking competition battle. But are best known as the first ever Hip Hop group or artists to perform in Washington D.C for a sitting President, specifically Ronald Reagan, during the 1984, "Kennedy Center Honors." The performance was broadcast nationally on CBS, and is considered a landmark for the acceptance of Hip Hop culture in America mainstream While performing in tribute to legendary choreographer and Kennedy Center Honoree Katherine Dunham at the Kennedy Center Honors, the NYC Breakers befriended Frank Sinatra, also an Honoree that year who was so impressed by the NYCB's performance.After Beat Street world tour finished Glide Master crashed on a motorcycle that's when Chino Action Lopez found Lil Alex next generation of B-boys. Then Frank Sinatra wrote a letter to Chino invited NYCB to perform again at the 50th Presidential Inaugural Gala for Ronald Reagan and George H. W. Bush where Lil Alex performed his first and last show right after this show NYC Breakers officially broke up to never perform all together again.

The N.Y.C Breakers were one of the first Hip Hop/B-boy crews that helped spread Hip Hop culture around the globe.Touring and performing for Presidents, world leaders and royalty (including England's Duke of York Prince Andrew and the King and Queen of Norway), they will always be remembered as crucial pioneers of the B-boy and Hip Hop Culture.

Original Five Members 
Chino "Action" Lopez
Noel "Kid Nice" Mangual 
Matthew "Glide Master" Caban 
Tony "Powerful Pexster" Lopez
Ray "Lil Lep" Ramos

Additional Members 
Bobby "Flip Rock'" Potts
Dennis"Kid Romance'" Deleon
Tony "Mr. Wave" Draughon 
Corey  "Icey Ice" Montalvo
London "B-Boy London" Reyes
Alex "Lil Alex" Roman
Mitchell "Speedy Dee" Martinez
Luis "Alien Ness" Martinez
Takahiro "ENGIN#9" Fujita
Peter "BAM the Liquid Robot" Arizmendi

References

External links
 https://www.youtube.com/watch?v=YHYPQEdr5Lw
 https://www.youtube.com/watch?v=kcQmRKBLzzs

American breakdancing groups
American hip hop dance groups
Organizations based in New York City